Renmin Road Subdistrict is a subdistrict situated in Jinshui District, Zhengzhou in the province of Henan, China. , it administers the following nine residential neighborhoods:
Renmin Road Community
Gongrenxincun Community
Zijingshan Road Community
Dongli Road Community
Shuiwenju Community
Shunhe Road First Community
Shunhe Road Second Community
Shunhe Road Third Community
Jinziyiyuan Community

See also
List of township-level divisions of Henan

References

Township-level divisions of Henan
Zhengzhou
Subdistricts of the People's Republic of China